The Ministry of Finance Building and Complex in Bandar Seri Begawan, Brunei, was constructed in 1990. With a height of 120 metres, it is the tallest building in the country and the fourth tallest building  on Borneo.

The building houses the Ministry of Finance Brunei, the Brunei Currency and Monetary Board and the Brunei Investment Agency. The building is located five kilometers outside of Downtown Bandar Seri Begawan.

See also
List of towers

References

Government buildings in Brunei
Skyscrapers in Brunei
Skyscraper office buildings
Kohn Pedersen Fox buildings
Office buildings completed in 1992